Edward Carrington Elmore (about 1826 – death date unknown, likely 1926) served as the Treasurer of the Confederate States of America during the American Civil War. His signature appears on collectible Confederate currency, and he designed several of the Confederacy's coins.

Biography

Elmore was a well-educated native of Columbia, South Carolina. He was a descendant of General John Archer Elmore. He received his education at South Carolina College. He became a prominent banker and married the daughter of a prominent family, Caroline Elizabeth Sims, on April 7, 1852. Shortly before the outbreak of the Civil War, he moved to Montgomery, Alabama

Shortly after the creation of the Confederacy, President Jefferson Davis recommended Elmore as its first treasurer, a decision endorsed by the Confederate States Secretary of the Treasury Christopher Memminger and ratified by the Provisional Confederate Congress. He took office on March 6, 1861. In his official capacity, Elmore had to receive, count, keep, and disburse government funds in cooperation with the Congress and other agencies. All requisitions drawn upon the national treasury had first to pass Elmore's inspection before they could assume the form of executive warrants. Even a warrant approved by the Comptroller and sanctioned by Memminger was subject to Elmore's review before being paid.

Memminger resigned his post as Secretary of the Treasury on July 18, 1864, and was replaced by fellow South Carolinian George Trenholm. However, Elmore initially stayed on as Treasurer under Trenholm.

In August 1864, Elmore accused John Moncure Daniel, the controversial editor of the Richmond Examiner, of slandering him by accusing Elmore and Secretary of State Judah P. Benjamin of gambling away government funds at a private club. When no retraction was forthcoming from the newspaperman, Elmore demanded a duel. The two opponents met on Belle Isle, and Elmore wounded Daniels with his first shot. One sympathetic former soldier later wrote, "The result of this duel occasioned as many hearty congratulations among the true Confederates in Richmond as if it had been the announcement of a victory by General Lee over the Federal army."

Shortly afterward, Elmore resigned his position as Treasurer and was replaced by John N. Hendren on October 10, 1864.

References

Confederate States Department of the Treasury officials
Politicians from Columbia, South Carolina
Politicians from Montgomery, Alabama
People of Alabama in the American Civil War
American duellists
1826 births
Year of death missing